Kookies N Kream is an Australian hip-hop dance crew best known for placing sixth in Season 6 of Australia's Got Talent in 2012. They were initially formed by Jet Valencia in 2009 who recruited Glen Gaspi, Natasha Pinto, Kimberly Grana, Dylan Elul, Gabriel Mendoza, Christopher Patacsil, and Mei Lin. After their first performance at a family Christmas party, Isabel Martinez, Gerina Perez, Patrick Maglaque, Emilynn Villianueva, Emily Lee, Bridgette Badger and Nicholas Giddings joined in 2010. By 2011, four more members had been recruited: Harry Harrop, Robert Mejica, Geraldina Hintko and Charmaine Bohol. Jet Valencia is the crew's dance teacher and director, currently managing the current Kookies N Kream generation with his wife Miriam Yousif.

History

Early career 
Jet Valencia began dancing and performing at age 18 in Sydney, Australia. The self-taught dancer was inspired by watching videos of other dancers online. He auditioned for season 2 of So You Think You Can Dance Australia and qualified as one of the Top 100 finalists. Valencia's dance style included popping, locking, krumping, and urban street dance. In Sydney, he formed his own dance group consisting of members Glen Gaspi, Natasha Pinto, Kimberly Grana, Dylan Elul, Gabriel Mendoza, Christopher Patacsil, and Mei Lin. The group performed their first dance routine at a family Christmas party in 2009. After their first performance, Valencia had ambitions to take the group to compete at a national level.  Through social and family connections of the original eight members, Isabel Martinez, Gerina Perez, Patrick Maglaque, Emilynn Villianueva, Emily Lee, Bridgette Badger and Nicholas Giddings joined in 2010, eventfully forming the group named Kookies N Kream.

Established in 2010 as Kookies N Kream Dance Crew, they began as a weekend dance class amongst friends in Glen Gaspi's living room. The group's name was inspired by the rugged street dance style of the males, co-existing with the smooth grooves from the females in the crew. The dance crew decided as a whole that they would train to compete in Sydney's dance crew competition, Looze Control on 28 August; they were awarded Champions of the Freshman Division. After placing first in their division, Kookies N Kream crew were chosen by Nojon Entertainment to be a supporting act for Poreotics Tic Tic Tour at the Sydney City Recital Hall, on 4 October 2010.

Kookies N Kream expanded in 2011, bringing the total members to nineteen. Harry Harrop, Glen Gaspi's cousin, was recruited, along with Robert Mejica, Geraldina Hintko and Charmaine Bohol, all of whom are high school friends of the original members.

Australia's Got Talent 

In 2012, Kookies N Kream auditioned as a nineteen-member group for the sixth season of Australia's Got Talent. The group was eliminated at sixth place in the Grand Finals Episode on 25 July.

Semi-final  

The "Order" columns lists the order of appearance each act made for every episode.

Final showdown 2

Grand Final

Awards
 1st Place Looze Control 2010
 1st Place Looze Control 2011
 Australias Got Talent Semi Finals 2012
 Australias Got Talent Finals 2012
 6th place Australias Got Talent Grand finalists 2012
 1st Place World Supremacy Battlegrounds Nationals 2016
 1st Place World Supremacy Battlegrounds Nationals 2018
 1st Place World Supremacy Battlegrounds Nationals 2021
 1st Australian Hip Hop Championships 2022
 9th Place World Hip Hop Championships 2022

Members

References

Australian hip hop groups